Col. David Carnegie  (15 February 1868 – 14 March 1949), was a British scientist, engineer and Liberal Party politician who worked for the Canadian government.

Background
He was the son of David Carnegie and Margaret Bogue of Aberdeen. He was educated at Gordon's College, Aberdeen and at the Royal College of Science, London. In 1896, he married Frances Ellen Lloyd of Leicester, and they had three sons.

Carnegie was a member of the Institution of Civil Engineers and the Institution of Mechanical Engineers, and was elected an Ordinary Fellow of the Royal Society of Edinburgh in 1910.

Engineering career
Before World War I, Carnegie worked at the Royal Laboratory of the Royal Arsenal at Woolwich, and later at Samuel Osborn & Company in Sheffield and Carnegie Brothers and Company in London. In 1916, he was described as "a consulting engineer of high standing".

In September 1914 he was appointed as Ordnance Adviser to the Shell Committee in Canada, on which he also sat as a member. When the Committee was replaced by the Imperial Munitions Board in December 1915, he was appointed as one of its members, and continued to serve as such until 1919. In 1915 he was appointed by the Canadian Government to chair a Commission  to inquire into the feasibility of refining zinc and copper in Canada, and he also conducted an inquiry into what coke oven capacity existed in Canada for the production of toluol (a key component of trinitrotoluene). He was Chairman of the Inventions Committee in Canada. He was appointed an Honorary Lieutenant-Colonel of the Canadian Militia in 1915, and became an Honorary Colonel in 1916, on his appointment as Consulting Technical Ordnance Adviser to the Department of Militia and Defence.

Public service
At the end of the War he returned to the UK and settled at Seasalter in Whitstable, Kent, but returned in 1919 as a delegate to the National Industrial Conference in Ottawa, where he spoke about the UK experience in establishing the Whitley Councils. In 1920 he was made a Commander of the Order of the British Empire.

In 1922 he was appointed to substitute for Minister of Labour James Murdock at that year's meetings of the International Labour Conference. He was a Canadian employers' representative to the International Labour Organization who was also named by the ILO to sit on the Temporary Mixed Commission for the Reduction of Armaments at the League of Nations from 1921–24.

Carnegie took a particular interest in international affairs through the League of Nations Union which was formed in 1918. In 1925 he was elected a Member of its Executive Committee, on which he remained for the next nine years. He was also interested in serving the local community and was a Justice of the peace.

Political career
He was the Liberal candidate for the Canterbury division of Kentin which his Whitstable residence was locatedat the 1924 General Election. It was a safe Unionist seat that had not elected a Liberal since 1868.

In November 1927 he was again Liberal candidate for the 1927 Canterbury by-election. 

He was Liberal candidate for the third time at Canterbury for the 1929 General Election.

He did not stand for parliament again.

Bibliography
He published a number of works:

 
 
 
 The Arms Industry, 1936
 
 World Economics and Peace, 1939
 The International Labour Organization in World Affairs, 1943

Further reading

References

1868 births
1949 deaths
Liberal Party (UK) parliamentary candidates
People educated at Robert Gordon's College
Alumni of the Royal College of Science
British mechanical engineers
Fellows of the Royal Society of Edinburgh
British civil engineers
Scientists from Aberdeen
People from Whitstable
Politicians from Aberdeen